The Ettampadai is a temple of Lord Murugan (Subrahmanya) in India, located in the neighbourhood of Triplicane (Thiruvallikkeni) in Chennai.

History
The idol of Lord Muruga of this temple is placed in the Kandhaswamy temple and Thiruporoor Murugan Temple. In the early days pilgrims carrying the Kavadi.

The land for the temple construction was donated by a woman named Pachayammal. To restructure this temple, Thiruvallikkeni Thirumuruganadiyargal, the local devotees of Lord Muruga, started a devotional musical organization called "Bhajaneshwara" in 1978. From the remuneration they received, the initial structure of this temple was restructured.

The Temple
The Ettampadai temple is the eighth Padaiveedu of Lord Muruga. In the first inner prakāram are the shrines of deities, namely, Pillayar, Kumbeshwara, Ambigai, and Sri Kanaga Durga. The Navagraha Sannidhi is beside the Ancient Pillar of Lord Muruga.

Festivals
Besides regular services, days sacred to the Lord Muruga are celebrated in a grand way every year and are attended by thousands of devotees from all over South India. Some of these festivals are the Thai-Poosam, the Vaikhashi-Vishakham and the Soora-Samharam.

Panguni Utthiram festival is the most famous festival at temple. The six-day celebration includes homams, devotional music, nadhaswara concert, kavadiattam, special abhishekam and annadhanam on the festival.

Pilgrims after first having taken a strict vow of abstinence, come barefoot, by walk, from distant towns and villages. Many pilgrims also bring a litter of wood, called a Kāvadi, borne on their shoulders, in commemoration of the act of the demon Hidumba who is credited by legend with bringing the two hills of Palani to their present location, slung upon his shoulders in a similar fashion. Others bring pots of sanctified water, known as theertha-kāvadi, for the priests to conduct the abhishekam on the holy day.

Poojas
Darshan hours are from 6:00 a.m. to 12.00 p.m. and 4.30 p.m. to 8.00 p.m. On festival days the temple opens at 4.30 a.m. and remains open till 10.30 p.m.

Annual festivals
 Kandha Shashti
 Vaigaasi Visagam
 Seshadri Swaamigal Jayanthi
 Panguni Utthira Peru Vizhaa - 25th Year Celebration (28–31 March 2010)

Gallery

See also

Murugan
Panguni Uthiram

References
 http://murugan.org.htm
 http://murugan.org/bhaktas/bhogar-life.htm
 http://www.hindu.com/thehindu/fr/2004/04/02/index.htm

External links
 

Hindu temples in Chennai
Murugan temples in Tamil Nadu